Jason Hadfield Dunstall (born 14 August 1964) is a former Australian rules footballer who played for the Hawthorn Football Club in the Australian Football League (AFL).

Dunstall is arguably the greatest Australian rules footballer to come from Queensland. Dunstall was one of the first of a generation of big bodied lead-up full forwards who could also out-wrestle opponents for position in a marking contest and was also an agile team oriented player. He made his name as a full-forward during an era in which power forwards including Tony Lockett, Gary Ablett Sr., Warwick Capper, Allen Jakovich, Saverio Rocca, John Longmire, Tony Modra and Peter Sumich dominated the league goal scoring. He is one of only six players to have kicked over 1,000 career goals in the VFL/AFL, and only Lockett and 's Gordon Coventry have kicked more career goals. In an interview in 2011, champion  footballer Wayne Carey regarded Dunstall as the best player he had seen and played against.

After finishing as a player, Dunstall has become a prominent football media personality, commentating matches for various radio stations in Melbourne and appearing regularly on Fox Footy as host of the show Bounce.  He became close friends with Danny Frawley during the 12 years they spent together on the program until his death in 2019.

Early life
Dunstall was born and raised in Brisbane as one of three sons, his brothers are Harry and Nicholas. He attended the Anglican Church Grammar School from 1977 to 1981. At school he played soccer as a goalkeeper and also rugby union. His junior Australian rules football was spent playing with the Coorparoo Football Club in the then Queensland Australian Football League (QAFL). In 1984, as a 20-year-old, Dunstall made his senior debut and enjoyed a stellar season, claiming the QAFL leading goalkicker award with 73 goals in the home and away season and kicking seven goals in Coorparoo's Grand Final win.

Dunstall was recruited to VFL club Hawthorn in 1985, touted as a new tall forward option, his recruitment largely overshadowed by that of promising West Australian recruit Steve Malaxos.

Whilst not immediately impressed by Dunstall's appearance, Allan Jeans became somewhat of a father figure over the course of the 1980s as his coach.  When a group of players was arrested after a night during an overseas trip, Jeans was called to the local police station to address their detention.  Jeans' advice to the officer has become a highlight of premiership reunion events - he reputedly advised the officer in charge he was free to shoot "him, him and him, but don't shoot the fat one" as he looked at his star full-forward.

League playing career

Dunstall made his 1985 VFL debut against Melbourne at Princes Park. He had an immediate impact, kicking an impressive 3 goals and 3 behinds in his team's demolition of the Demons, however was 3rd in the teams goalkicking behind Dermott Brereton and John Kennedy. He was dropped from the side 3 games later after a loss to Richmond however regained some form towards the end of the season finishing with 35 goals. In his breakout game against Richmond, he would kick 8 goals, and the media heralded the 20 year old Queenslander as a future star.

1988 was a special year for Dunstall. In Round 19 against  he brought up his first century of goals in a season. He had kicked 98 goals going into the match, and Hawthorn supporters expected the required two goals to come sooner rather than later. However, Dunstall would miss his first two shots and drop a few marks before putting through his first goal at the 17-minute mark. The moment of truth came at the 30-minute mark of the first quarter when teammate Dermott Brereton kicked the ball high into the air. It took a vicious bounce over Fitzroy defender Brett Stephens' head and landed in Dunstall's arms. The goal was kicked and the fans came running onto the ground to congratulate only the second Hawthorn player after Peter Hudson to kick 100 goals in a season. 

Dunstall kicked a further six goals for the game to finish with 8 goals. He would finish the home-and-away season with 124 goals, winning his first Coleman Medal. He also won his first club best and fairest award. In the 1988 Grand Final massacre against , he kicked 7 goals.

Dunstall established his reputation as one of the best full-forwards in Australia during the 1989 VFL season. He won his second straight Coleman Medal with 128 goals during the home-and-away season and finished third in the Brownlow Medal vote count. He kicked ten or more goals in a match twice: In Round 16, he kicked 11 goals against , and 11 goals against  in Round 22. Dunstall added ten more goals during the Finals series, four of those in the epic 1989 premiership victory, to take his overall tally to 138 goals for the season. He also won the club best and fairest award for the second straight year. Representing Victoria in the State of Origin series, Dunstall won the Simpson Medal for best on ground in the match against Western Australia played in Perth.

1990s
1990 began promisingly enough for Dunstall. In Round 1, in the Grand Final rematch against  at Waverley Park, he kicked a then career-best 12 goals after being held goalless in the first quarter. Hawthorn went on to thrash the Cats by 115 points. In Round 4 against  at Princes Park in wet conditions, Dunstall kicked 8 goals, bringing up his 500th career goal in the process, as the Hawks won by 82 points. But in Round 9 against , Dunstall was injured in the first quarter. He fell heavily on an opponent's boot and sustained a serious injury at the front of his head. He was taken from the ground and admitted to The Alfred Hospital. At that stage of the season Dunstall had kicked 41 goals. The injury would cause him to miss the next four matches. After his return in Round 14, he kicked a further 42 goals, including 11 goals against Collingwood in Round 20. On the Footy show after the 1990 AFL Grand Final, Leigh Matthews said that he was glad Hawthorn got knocked out of the finals, because Dunstall always seemed to kick a huge number of goals against the recently crowned premiers.

Dunstall kicked 82 goals in 1991, including 6 in the Grand Final as Hawthorn claimed their 9th Premiership. But Dunstall enjoyed arguably his most successful season on an individual level. He won his third Coleman Medal after kicking 139 goals during the home-and-away season (six more in the Elimination Final took his season tally to 145), and finished second in the Brownlow Medal vote count. 
Dunstall reached his century of goals against  in Round 16 at Kardinia Park with his fifth goal of the match just before half-time. He ended the match with 9 goals and beat three opponents as Hawthorn won by 19 points.
Dunstall's outstanding season was recognized with his third club best and fairest award, as well as his first selection in the All-Australian team at full-forward.

In the Elimination Final in 1996 against Sydney, Dunstall tumbled over Andrew Dunkley and was left writhing on the ground clutching a badly injured knee which required a knee reconstruction.  Surprisingly, Dunstall's knee healed well enough for him to play half a reserves match just before the start of the 1997 AFL season, and was picked to play against  in the opening round.

Dunstall recovered in time for the start of the 1998 AFL season. He had kicked 52 goals for the season before tragedy again struck in Round 14 against , the same team against which Dunstall had injured his knee the previous season. Lining up on illustrious opponent Stephen Silvagni, Dunstall twisted and fell on his right shoulder early in the second quarter. Silvagni accidentally landed on top of Dunstall at the same time, forcing Dunstall's shoulder into the ground and breaking his collarbone.

Dunstall's shoulder was put in a special brace for several weeks, and club physiotherapist Barry Gavin was optimistic of his chances of returning before the end of the season, a view not shared by doctors at several other clubs. Dunstall did return for the final game of the year, but only after having announced his retirement, first to the Hawthorn coaching and management staff, then to the general public on the Seven Network football show Live and Kicking.

Before Dunstall's final game, against  at Waverley Park, a number of his former teammates and associates came to congratulate him, including coach Allan Jeans. Dunstall was clearly moved by the occasion, and combined with a severe lack of match fitness, struggled to have much impact on the game. He did however, score the first goal of the game and the first goal of the last term. Nevertheless, the 40,000 or so Hawthorn fans that came to pay tribute to their champion cheered every touch that Dunstall got of the ball. The Hawks kicked 11 goals in the last quarter to win by 89 points, and amid emotional scenes Dunstall was chaired off the ground by his teammates, bringing to a close the most successful chapter in Hawthorn's on-field history.

Statistics

|-
| 1985 ||  || 19
| 16 || 36 || 27 || 123 || 42 || 165 || 62 ||  || 2.3 || 1.7 || 7.7 || 2.6 || 10.3 || 3.9 ||  || 2
|-
| bgcolor=F0E68C | 1986# ||  || 19
| 22 || 77 || 31 || 163 || 55 || 218 || 123 ||  || 3.5 || 1.4 || 7.4 || 2.5 || 9.9 || 5.6 ||  || 5
|-
| 1987 ||  || 19
| 24 || 94 || bgcolor=CAE1FF | 58† || 231 || 42 || 273 || 143 || 13 || 3.9 || 2.4 || 9.6 || 1.8 || 11.4 || 6.0 || 0.5 || 9
|-
| bgcolor=F0E68C | 1988# ||  || 19
| 23 || bgcolor=CAE1FF | 132† || bgcolor=CAE1FF | 66† || 270 || 47 || 317 || bgcolor=CAE1FF | 185† || 20 || bgcolor=CAE1FF | 5.7† || 2.9 || 11.7 || 2.0 || 13.8 || bgcolor=CAE1FF | 8.0† || 0.9 || 16
|-
| bgcolor=F0E68C | 1989# ||  || 19
| 24 || bgcolor=CAE1FF | 138† || bgcolor=CAE1FF | 76† || 306 || 54 || 360 || bgcolor=CAE1FF| 207† || 21 || 5.8 || bgcolor=CAE1FF | 3.2† || 12.8 || 2.3 || 15.0 || 8.6 || 0.9 || 16
|-
| 1990 ||  || 19
| 18 || 83 || 39 || 157 || 36 || 193 || 113 || 10 || 4.6 || 2.2 || 8.7 || 2.0 || 10.7 || 6.3 || 0.6 || 9
|-
| bgcolor=F0E68C | 1991# ||  || 19
| 18 || 82 || 47 || 177 || 41 || 218 || 105 || 18 || 4.6 || 2.6 || 9.8 || 2.3 || 12.1 || 5.8 || 1.0 || 4
|-
| 1992 ||  || 19
| 23 || bgcolor=CAE1FF | 145† || bgcolor=CAE1FF | 84† || 284 || 59 || 343 || bgcolor=CAE1FF | 199† || 19 || bgcolor=CAE1FF| 6.3† || bgcolor=CAE1FF | 3.7† || 12.3 || 2.6 || 14.9 || 8.7 || 0.8 || 18
|-
| 1993 ||  || 19
| 21 || 123 || 55 || 235 || 42 || 277 || 166 || 16 || 5.9 || 2.6 || 11.2 || 2.0 || 13.2 || 7.9 || 0.8 || 16
|-
| 1994 ||  || 19
| 19 || 101 || 47 || 194 || 58 || 252 || 144 || 23 || 5.3 || 2.5 || 10.2 || 3.1 || 13.3 || 7.6 || 1.2 || 12
|-
| 1995 ||  || 19
| 17 || 66 || 38 || 142 || 32 || 174 || 102 || 10 || 3.9 || 2.2 || 8.4 || 1.9 || 10.2 || 6.0 || 0.6 || 2
|-
| 1996 ||  || 19
| 23 || 102 || 45 || 187 || 62 || 249 || 132 || 12 || 4.4 || 2.0 || 8.1 || 2.7 || 10.8 || 5.7 || 0.5 || 11
|-
| 1997 ||  || 19
| 8 || 21 || 10 || 43 || 16 || 59 || 33 || 6 || 2.6 || 1.3 || 5.4 || 2.0 || 7.4 || 4.1 || 0.8 || 0
|-
| 1998 ||  || 19
| 13 || 54 || 18 || 88 || 21 || 109 || 65 || 6 || 4.2 || 1.4 || 6.8 || 1.6 || 8.4 || 5.0 || 0.5 || 9
|- class="sortbottom"
! colspan=3| Career
! 269 !! 1254 !! 641 !! 2600 !! 607 !! 3207 !! 1779 !! 174 !! 4.7 !! 2.4 !! 9.7 !! 2.3 !! 11.9 !! 6.6 !! 0.6 !! 129
|}

Honours and achievements
Team
 4× VFL/AFL premiership player: 1986, 1988, 1989, 1991
 3× Minor premiership: 1986, 1988, 1989

Individual
 AFLPA MVP: 1992
 3× Coleman Medal: 1988, 1989, 1992
 2× All-Australian team: 1992, 1994
 4× Peter Crimmins Memorial Trophy: 1988, 1989, 1992, 1993
 12× Hawthorn leading goalkicker: 1986, 1987, 1988, 1989, 1990, 1991, 1992, 1993, 1994, 1995, 1996, 1998
 Hawthorn captain: 1995–1998
 Simpson Medal: 1989
 E. J. Whitten Medal: 1989
 Australian Football Hall of Fame
  Hall of Fame – Legend status
  Team of the Century

Post-football
Dunstall has been guest commentator on the Seven Network and radio station 3AW and was a regular panellist in the early days of The Footy Show.

In 2002 Dunstall was inducted into the Australian Football Hall of Fame.

In 2004 Dunstall held the position of interim CEO at ,. After handing over the CEO position Dunstall remained on the Hawthorn board until the end of 2013 when his term expired. He currently works on radio station Triple M as a commentator. His stint as CEO led to the nickname of "The Chief". His mannerisms on Fox Footy and Triple M lean towards professionalism, which at times can be seen as too serious (as seen on the 80's Heritage Round episode of The AFL Footy Show on 20 July 2006, where he refused to dress up to mark the occasion.) He has been the focus on continual baiting by his Triple M co-commentators and is nicknamed "The Ugandan National Symbol" for his gorilla-like style, attitude and demeanour. These gorilla references made their way onto The Footy Show, where both fans and Sam Newman repeatably baited Dunstall with video clips and props.

In early September 2008 the hosts of The Footy Show launched "The Great Chief Chase" in which viewers were offered five double passes to The Footy Show Grand Final concert for the best photo a person could take with Dunstall. Dunstall was reportedly furious when details of his whereabouts were made public, resulting in people knocking on his house door asking for photos with him. He was especially threatening towards James Brayshaw, a colleague at Triple M and one of the hosts on The Footy Show who had labelled Dunstall a "sook". Dunstall and Brayshaw formally ended their feud the following week at the Victoria Racing Club footy finals fever lunch.
 
Dunstall has also hosted various television shows, including the Seven Network's Live and Kicking and Fox Footy's Saturday Central (with Wayne Carey), On the Couch and League Teams. He was a host of Triple M radio show The Gospel with Nathan Brown, Peter Everitt and Nick Riewoldt until 2006.

He was a member of The Friday Rub on Friday nights alongside James Brayshaw, Garry Lyon and Damian Barrett on Triple M. Dunstall is also the host of Bounce, a weekly football show broadcast on Fox Footy with Cameron Mooney.

Reflecting his Queensland upbringing, Dunstall is depicted lining up for goal wearing a Queensland state guernsey in Jamie Cooper's painting the Game That Made Australia, commissioned by the AFL in 2008 to celebrate the 150th anniversary of the sport.

A stand at the Cooparoo oval and the schoolboys competition in Brisbane (Jason Dunstall Cup) are both named after him

In July 2014, Dunstall was elevated to legend status in the Hawthorn Hall of Fame.

On 9 April 9, 2015 the Melbourne Renegades announced that they have appointed Dunstall as the club's new Chairman, replacing outgoing Chairman and fellow Triple M Footy colleague James Brayshaw.

Personal life 
As of 2003, he was married to wife Deb Dunstall.

References

Bibliography
The Goal King: Jason Dunstall's own story ( With Ken Piesse) Melbourne : Wilkinson Books, 1995.  :

External links

 AFL Hall of Fame - Players
 Playlist of Hawthorn v Footscray Round 19, 1996 - Dunstall kicked 14 goals in this match

Australian rules footballers from Queensland
All-Australians (AFL)
Australian Football Hall of Fame inductees
Hawthorn Football Club players
Hawthorn Football Club Premiership players
Hawthorn Football Club administrators
Peter Crimmins Medal winners
Leigh Matthews Trophy winners
Victorian State of Origin players
Coleman Medal winners
Australian rules football commentators
Australian television presenters
Coorparoo Football Club players
Triple M presenters
Sportspeople from Brisbane
1964 births
Living people
Australian sports journalists
People educated at Anglican Church Grammar School
Allies State of Origin players
E. J. Whitten Medal winners
Four-time VFL/AFL Premiership players